Theodore Russell Weiss (16 December 1916 Reading, Pennsylvania – 15 April 2003 Princeton, New Jersey) was an American poet, and literary magazine editor.

Life
He graduated from Muhlenberg College in 1938 and Columbia University in 1940. He was an instructor at the University of Maryland, College Park, the University of North Carolina, Yale University, and Bard College.  He taught at Princeton University, until retirement in 1987.

He edited (with his wife, Renee Karol Weiss) Quarterly Review of Literature, which published William Carlos Williams, Wallace Stevens, E. E. Cummings, and Ezra Pound.

In 1987, he was the subject of a documentary, Living Poetry: A Year in the Life of a Poem, made by Harvey Edwards.

Awards
 1956 Wallace Stevens Award
 1977 Brandeis Creative Arts Award in Poetry
 1988-89 Poetry Society of America's Shelley Memorial Award
 1997 Oscar Williams and Gene Durwood Award for Poetry
 1997 PEN/Nora Magid Lifetime Achievement Award
 Guggenheim fellowship
 Ford Foundation fellowship
 National Foundation of the Arts and Humanities fellowship
 Ingram Merrill Foundation fellowship

Works

Poetry
 The World Before Us: Poems, 1950-1970 (Macmillan, 1970)
 Fireweeds (Macmillan, 1976),
 A Slow Fuse: New Poems (Macmillan, 1984)
 A Sum of Destructions (Louisiana State University Press, 1995),

Essays
 The Breath of Clowns and Kings (Atheneum, 1971), a study of Shakespeare's early comedies and histories
 The Man From Porlock: Engagements, 1944-1981 (Princeton University Press, 1982), a collection of essays.

Edited
 Selections From the Notebooks of Gerard Manley Hopkins (New Directions, 1945).

External links

References
General references

Inline citations

1916 births
2003 deaths
Muhlenberg College alumni
Columbia University alumni
University of Maryland, College Park faculty
Yale University faculty
Bard College faculty
Princeton University faculty
20th-century American poets
Writers from Reading, Pennsylvania
American magazine publishers (people)
University of North Carolina at Chapel Hill faculty